Nafisah Ahmad Zen Shahab (born August 1, 1946) is an Indonesian batik trader from Palembang, South Sumatra. Nafisah is known as a mother who acts as the sole parent in her family after her husband, Alwi Idrus Shahab died in 1996. On the 20th anniversary commemoration of Indonesian World Records Museum (MURI) at Mall of Indonesia on February 3, 2010, Nafisah, the mother of twelve children, ten of whom became doctors, broke the MURI record as the family with the most doctors in Indonesia. Of her ten children who became doctors, five of them are specialists. Her eldest son, Prof. Dr. dr. Idrus Alwi, Sp.PD., K-KV, FECS, FACC., is a cardiovascular specialist and is the Chairman of the Association of Indonesian Internal Medicine Experts (PB PAPDI) for the period 2012–2015.

References

Works cited

Bibliography

 
 

1946 births
People from Palembang
Indonesian women in business
Indonesian people of Yemeni descent
Living people
Indonesian businesspeople